Korapuzha, also known as Elathur River, is a short river of , with a drainage area of , flowing through the Kozhikode district of Kerala state in India. It is formed by the confluence of two streams, Akalapuzha and Punoor puzha which originate in the mountains of Wayanad district. The Korapuzha empties into the Arabian Sea at Elathur. The river and its main tributaries become tidal as they near the Arabian Sea. There is heavy boat traffic over the last  of its course. It forms part of the West Coast Inland Navigation System.

Korappuzha bridge

This 480-metre bridge is the longest bridge in Kozhikode district.  Completed in 1940, it has 13 spans.  The surroundings are lush green and very photogenic.

HIstory
The river for some times formed the northern border of the Zamorin's kingdom. 
The Korapuzha is generally considered as the cordon sanitaire between the North Malabar and South Malabar in the erstwhile Malabar District. Until the 20th century the Nair women of North Malabar crossing the Korapuzha and going south or marrying a person from South Malabar was considered a taboo and those who violated faced Bhrasht (Ostracism) and forfeiture of caste. Similarly some difference can be seen in Thiyya community as well.

Notes

References

Malabar Manual in two volumes by William Logan, first published in 1887, reprinted by Asian Educational Services in 1951.
Nayars of Malabar Vol III by F. Fawcett, first published in 1901.

Rivers of Kozhikode district
Vatakara area